The greater prairie chicken or pinnated grouse (Tympanuchus cupido), sometimes called a boomer, is a large bird in the grouse family. This North American species was once abundant, but has become extremely rare and extirpated over much of its range due to habitat loss. Conservation measures are underway to ensure the sustainability of existing small populations. One of the most famous aspects of these creatures is the mating ritual called booming.

Description
Adults of both sexes are medium to large chicken-like birds, stocky with round-wings. They have short tails which are typically rounded. Adult males have orange comb-like feathers over their eyes and dark, elongated head feathers that can be raised or lain along neck. They also possess a circular, un-feathered neck patch which can be inflated while displaying; this, like their comb feathers, is also orange. As with many other bird species, the adult females have shorter head feathers and also lack the male's yellow comb and orange neck patch. Adults are about 16.9 in (43 cm) long, and weigh between 24.7–42.3 oz (700–1200 g). The greater prairie-chicken has a wingspan range of 27.4-28.5 in (69.5-72.5 cm).

Subspecies
There are three subspecies;
 The heath hen, Tympanuchus cupido cupido, which was historically found along the Atlantic coast, is extinct. It was possibly a distinct species; in this case the two other forms would be T. pinnatus pinnatus and T. p. attwateri.
 Attwater's prairie chicken, T. c. attwateri is endangered and restricted to coastal Texas.
 The greater prairie chicken, T. c. pinnatus, is now restricted to a small section of its former range.

Population and habitat
Greater prairie chickens prefer undisturbed prairie and were originally found in tallgrass prairies. They can tolerate agricultural land mixed with prairie, but fewer prairie chickens are found in areas that are more agricultural. Their diet consists primarily of seeds and fruit, but during the summer they also eat green plants and insects such as grasshoppers, crickets, and beetles. These birds were once widespread all across the oak savanna and tall grass prairie ecosystem.

Conservation

The greater prairie chicken was almost extinct in the 1930s due to hunting pressure and habitat loss. In Illinois alone, in the 1800s the prairie chicken numbered in the millions.  They were a popular game bird, and like many prairie birds, which have also suffered massive habitat loss, they are now on the verge of extinction, with the wild bird population at around 200 in Illinois in 2019. They now only live on small parcels of managed prairie land.  Throughout North America, it is thought that their current population has declined severely, to approximately 500,000 individuals. In May 2000, the Canadian Species at Risk Act listed the greater prairie chicken as extirpated in its Canadian range (Alberta, Saskatchewan, Manitoba, Ontario). It was again confirmed by the Committee on the Status of Endangered Wildlife in Canada in November 2009. Nonetheless, sightings and encounters continue to occur in the south-central regions of Alberta and Saskatchewan, along with southern Ontario, where sightings are extremely rare.

In states such as Iowa and Missouri that once had thriving prairie chicken populations (estimated to be hundreds of thousands), total numbers have dropped to about 500. However, the Missouri Department of Conservation has started a program to import prairie chickens from Kansas and Nebraska in the hopes that they will be able to repopulate the state and increase that number to 3,000.

Central Wisconsin is home to approximately 600 individuals, down from 55,000 when hunting was prohibited in 1954. Though this area was predominately spruce and tamarack marsh before European settlement, early pioneers drained the marshes and attempted to farm the poor soil. As the prairies to the south and west were lost to agriculture and development, and the southern half of Wisconsin was logged, the prairies spread northward into the abandoned farmland. Today, over 30,000 acres are managed by the Wisconsin Department of Natural Resources as greater prairie chicken habitat. Birdwatchers travel from around the world to visit Wisconsin in April for the Central Wisconsin Prairie Chicken Festival, started in 2006 by Golden Sands Resource Conservation & Development Council, Inc.

Threats
Greater prairie chickens are not threatened by severe winter weather. When the snow is thick they "dive" into the snow to keep warm. A greater threat to the prairie chickens comes in the form of spring rains. These sometimes drenching rains can wreak havoc on their chicks. Another major natural threat is drought. A drought can destroy food and make it difficult for the chicks.

Human interactions are by far the greatest threat. The conversion of native prairie to cropland is very detrimental to these birds. It was found in a radio telemetry study conducted by Kansas State University that "most prairie chicken hens avoided nesting or rearing their broods within a quarter-mile of power lines and within a third-mile of improved roads." (Kansas Department of Wildlife and Parks) It was also found that the prairie-chickens avoided communication towers and rural farms.

After population bottleneck, human management of populations can also produce a loss of genetic variation and genetic diversity in the species.

Sexual behavior

Greater prairie chickens do not migrate. They are territorial birds and often defend their booming grounds. These booming grounds are the area in which they perform their displays in hopes of attracting females. Their displays consist of inflating air sacs located on the side of their neck and snapping their tails. These booming grounds usually have very short or no vegetation. The male prairie-chickens stay on this ground displaying for almost two months. The breeding season usually begins in the United States starting in late March throughout April. During this time the males establish booming sites where they display for the females. The one or two most dominant males can obtain 90% of mating opportunities. Due to their now small populations and habitat fragmentation the greater prairie chickens often undergo inbreeding causing observable inbreeding depression: with fewer offspring and a decreased survival rate within these limited offspring further aiding their population decrease.

After mating has taken place, the females move about one mile from the booming grounds and begin to build their nests. Hens lay between 5 and 17 eggs per clutch and the eggs take between 23 and 24 days to hatch. There are between five and 10 young per brood. (INRIN, 2005). The young are raised by the female and fledge in one to four weeks, are completely independent by the tenth to twelfth week, and reach sexual maturity by age one (Ammann, 1957). A study of female greater prairie chickens in Kansas found that their survival rates were 1.6 to 2.0 times higher during the non-breeding season compared to the breeding season; this was due to heavy predation during nesting and brood-rearing. One problem facing prairie chickens is competition with the ring-necked pheasants. Pheasants lay their eggs in prairie-chicken nests. The pheasant eggs hatch first; this causes the prairie chickens to leave the nest thinking that the young have hatched. In reality the eggs did not hatch and the young usually die because the mother is not there to incubate the eggs.

See also
 Lesser prairie chicken
 Lekking

References

 ARKive - images and movies of the greater prairie chicken (Tympanuchus cupido)
 USGS Patuxent Bird Identification InfoCenter - Greater Prairie Chicken
 Gunderson, Dan. "Prairie chickens booming again." Minnesota Public Radio (2006) 
 Ammann, G. A. 1957 The prairie grouse of Michigan. Michigan Dept. Consew. Tech. Bull.
 Illinois Natural Resource Information Network: Greater Prairie Chickens
 Kansas Department of Wildlife and Parks: Greater and Lesser Prairie Chickens
 State conservationists scour the Kansas boondocks, aiming to repopulate Missouri with horny prairie chickens

External links

 Comparative Analysis between the Greater Prairie Chicken and the Extinct Heath Hen
 Cornell Lab of Ornithology - Greater Prairie Chicken
 USGS Patuxent Bird Identification InfoCenter - Greater Prairie Chicken
 The Nature Conservancy's Grassland Birds: Greater Prairie Chicken
 gbwf.org - Greater Prairie Chicken
 eNature.com - Greater Prairie Chicken
 Stamps (for Canada)
 Greater Prairie Chicken photo gallery VIREO
The Return of the Prairie Chicken Documentary produced by Iowa Public Television

Tympanuchus
Grouse
Endemic birds of the Plains-Midwest (United States)
Birds described in 1758
Articles containing video clips
Taxa named by Carl Linnaeus